Giuseppe Chiantia (1 January 1893 – April 1971) was an Italian equestrian. He competed in two events at the 1936 Summer Olympics.

References

1893 births
1971 deaths
Italian male equestrians
Olympic equestrians of Italy
Equestrians at the 1936 Summer Olympics
People from Riesi
Sportspeople from the Province of Caltanissetta